Michelle Citron (born 1948, Boston, Massachusetts) is a film, video and multimedia artist, scholar and author.

Early life 

Michelle Citron was born in Boston, Massachusetts. She attended the University of Massachusetts, earning a B.S. in Psychology. She has an Interdisciplinary Ph.D. in cognitive studies and aesthetics from the University of Wisconsin-Madison. Citron was a Professor of Radio/Television/Film at Northwestern University from 1978 to 2006, where she also served as Associate Dean of The Graduate School and Chair of the Department of Radio/Television/FIlm.  She was Chair of the Interdisciplinary Arts Department, Columbia College Chicago from 2006-2012.

Career 
Citron's films explore the lives of women – mothers and daughters, women in the workplace, the trauma of incest, lesbian culture – as well as ethnic identity. These works, influenced by avant-garde film and feminism, blend experimental styles with melodrama and an exploration of the border between documentary and fiction. This experimentation continues with a series of more recent interactive narratives as well as her writing, particularly her book, Home Movies and Other Necessary Fictions.

Filmography (partial list)

Multimedia 
Since 1999, Citron has explored new ways to experience story with a series interactive narratives that collectively comprise Queerfeast.com.  Each piece in the series is a distinct work; collectively they create a multi-course meal of lesbian life played out through its pleasures, complications, and contradictions.

Bibliography 
Citron is the author of Home Movies and Other Necessary Fictions,  a hybrid memoir.  The book examines the relationship between history and memory, psyche and art, non-fiction and imagination, memory and aesthetic strategies. Joe Bonomo, in The Georgia Review, called it "a uniquely powerful book… The result is nothing short of an illuminating cross-genre deconstruction of childhood myth and fantasy, representation and objectively."

The book was awarded the Krasna-Krause Moving Image Book Award, Special Commendation 1999 (International).  The award jury cited the book for being "an extraordinary blend of autobiographical and film writing which offers a radical new way of thinking and writing about film."  It won two additional awards:  The Kovacs Book Award, Society for Cinema Studies 1999, Special Commendation; and Outstanding Book Award, Organization for the study of Communication, Language and Gender 1999.

Citron is also the author of numerous book chapters and articles including:

 "Slipping the Borders/Shifting the Fragments," in There She Goes: Feminist Filmmaking and Beyond, ed. Corinne Columpar & Sophie Mayer, Wayne State University Press, 2009
 "Fleeing from Documentary: The Ethics of Autobiographical Filmmaking," in Feminism and Documentary, ed. Diane Waldman and Janet Walker, University of Minnesota Press, 1999
"Women's Film Production: Going Mainstream," in The Female Spectator: Looking at Film and TV, ed. E. DeidrePribram, Verso Press, London and Routledge, Chapman & Hart. 1988

Notes

References 

"If I Am (Not) For Myself," Sophie Mayer, in ""The Cinema of Me: Self and Subjectivity in First-Person Documentary"", Ed. Alisa Lebow, Columbia University Press, NY, 2012.
"Making Media: Foundations of Sound and Image Production," Jan Roberts-Breslin, Focal Press, NY, 2002.
""Home Movies and Other Necessary Fictions"", Aufderheide, Patricia, Feminist Studies, Spring 2001.
"Daughter Rite" and "Daughters of Chaos," ""Studien zum amerikanischen Dokumentarfilm, Susan Rieser and Klaus Rieser-Wohlfarter, Wissenschaftlicher, Trier, Germany 1996"" .
Kuhn, Annette, ""Women's Pictures: Feminism & Cinema"", 2nd edition, Verso Press, London, 1994.
William's, Linda, "Women's Work," Reader, Chic, May 13, 1983. reprinted as "What You Take For Granted...", in ""New Challenges"" for Documentary, ed. Alan Rosenthal, University of California Press, Berkeley, 1988.
Kaplan, E. Ann, ""Women and Film:  Both Sides of the Camera"", Methuen, NY & London, 1983. Chapter 12.
Williams, Linda and B. Ruby Rich, "The Right of Re-Vision: Michelle Citron's ""Daughter Rite""," Film Quarterly, Vol. 25, No 1, Fall 1981, Reprinted in Movies & Methods, ed. William Nichols, University of California Press, Berkeley, 1986.

External links 
Official Website

The Ambiguous Archive: An Interview with Michelle Citron

1948 births
Date of birth missing (living people)
Living people
University of Massachusetts Boston alumni
Interdisciplinary artists
Feminist studies scholars
Northwestern University faculty
American documentary filmmakers
Writers from Boston